Vigil  is a British police procedural television serial created by Tom Edge and produced by World Productions. The six-part series aired on BBC One in August 2021. It stars Suranne Jones, Rose Leslie, Shaun Evans, Paterson Joseph, and Martin Compston. The series is set in Scotland and much of the action takes place on a fictional ballistic missile submarine of the Royal Navy.

The series received generally positive reviews from critics, with praise for the writing, pace, acting, visual style, set design, tone, and atmosphere, but it was criticised for the dialogue, plot, and inaccuracies. In March 2022, the series was renewed for a second series.

Plot
Detective Chief Inspector Amy Silva of the Scottish Police Service is sent to HMS Vigil, a nuclear-powered Vanguard-class ballistic missile submarine, to investigate a death on board, which takes place shortly after the mysterious disappearance of a Scottish fishing trawler. Her investigations, and those of her colleagues ashore, bring the police into conflict with the Royal Navy and MI5, the British Security Service.

The loss of the fictional trawler Mhairi Finnea in the series bears similarities to the sinking of the FV Antares by Royal Navy nuclear-powered submarine HMS Trenchant in the Firth of Clyde in 1990.  Families of the Antares''' crew expressed upset at scenes of the Mhairi Finnea foundering; however, the BBC denied that the drama was inspired by or based on a specific real-life event.

Cast
 Suranne Jones as Detective Chief Inspector Amy Silva
 Rose Leslie as Detective Sergeant Kirsten Longacre
 Shaun Evans as Warrant Officer Class One Elliot Glover, the coxswain  of HMS Vigil Martin Compston as Chief Petty Officer Craig Burke, a sonar mapping expert on HMS Vigil Paterson Joseph as Commander Neil Newsome, the Captain of HMS Vigil Adam James as Lieutenant Commander Mark Prentice, the Executive Officer of HMS Vigil Gary Lewis as Detective Superintendent Colin Robertson
 Lauren Lyle as Jade Antoniak, a peace activist
 Therese Bradley as Laura Michaels, an MI5 officer
 Parth Thakerar as Jay Kohli, an MI5 officer
 Lolita Chakrabarti as Lieutenant Commander Erin Branning, Shaw's aide
 Dan Li as Lieutenant Commander Hennessy, the Weapons Engineer Officer on HMS Vigil Lorne MacFadyen as Chief Petty Officer Matthew Doward, a sonar mapping expert transferred from HMS Virtue Connor Swindells as Lieutenant Simon Hadlow, an engineering officer on HMS Vigil Lois Chimimba as Chief Petty Officer Tara Kierly, a sonar mapping expert of HMS Vigil Daniel Portman as Chief Petty Officer Gary Walsh, an engineer on HMS Vigil Anjli Mohindra as Surgeon Lieutenant Tiffany  Docherty, the medical officer on HMS Vigil Anita Vettesse as Petty Officer Jackie Hamilton, chef on HMS Vigil Stephen Dillane as Rear Admiral Shaw, Head of the Royal Navy Submarine Service
 Orla Russell as Poppy, the daughter of Silva's boyfriend
 Reuben Joseph as DS Porter
 Cal MacAninch as Ben Oakley, peace activist

Production
In a 2021 interview, writer Edge was approached by development producer George Aza-Selinger to develop a submarine project for television. It was inspired by the UK's Continuous At-Sea Deterrent (CASD) and the life of its submarine crews. The show was filmed and primarily set in Scotland. Production designer Tom Sayer created elaborate studio sets to represent the interior of the submarine.

Music
The programme's theme music is the song "Fuel to Fire" from the 2013 album Aventine by Danish singer, songwriter and musician Agnes Obel. Other music included in the series is composed by Afterhere (Berenice Scott and Glenn Gregory). Episode 4 includes the song "Anchor" by Welsh singer, songwriter and multi-instrumentalist Novo Amor, released as a single in 2015 and included on his 2017 EP Bathing Beach.

Episodes
{{Episode table |overall=#000000 |title= |director= |writer= |airdate= |airdateR= |viewers=7 | viewersT = UK viewers (millions)7 day |viewersR= |country=UK |aux4 =7|aux4T= UK viewers (millions)28 day |aux4R= |episodes= 

{{Episode list
 |EpisodeNumber   = 4
 |Title           = Episode 4
 |RTitle          =
 |DirectedBy      = Isabelle Sieb
 |WrittenBy       = Chandni Lakhani
 |OriginalAirDate = 
 |Viewers         = 9.28
 |Aux4            = 11.88
 |ShortSummary    = MI5 reveal to the police that the suspected murderer of Jade was a Russian GRU spy with diplomatic immunity. The police, MI5 and the navy present their findings to the Secretary of State for Defence, and speculate that there may be a Russian spy on board the Vigil. Shaw reluctantly makes the decision to recall the submarine, but there is no response because Vigil's communications are down as a result of sabotage. On Vigil, suspicion falls on the chief cook, Jackie Hamilton, whose son was imprisoned in Indonesia on drug charges, which have suddenly been dropped. Hamilton is later found dead by Silva and Silva is attacked by an unknown assailant wearing a mask. 
 |LineColor       = 000000
}}

}}

Reception
Ratings
Episode 1 attracted an audience of 10.2 million viewers across its first seven days, making Vigil the BBC's most watched new drama of the year.

Critical

The review aggregator Rotten Tomatoes gave the series a 85% approval rating, with an average rating of 6.6/10, based on 20 reviews. The critical consensus reads, "Vigil is ludicrous just as often as it is suspenseful, but a committed cast and pulpy pace make it worth diving in”. On Metacritic, the series has a weighted average score of 83 out of 100 based on 5 reviews, indicating "universal acclaim”.

Lucy Mangan of The Guardian found the first episode intriguing, awarding it five stars and describing it as "solid, old-fashioned entertainment". The Independent gave the first episode four out of five stars, praising the cast and Tom Edge's writing. In a four-starred review for London's Evening Standard, Katie Rosseinsky said: "Even scenes set in the depths of the sub are visually striking, lit up in reds and blues. Add in some jump scares, a handful of near-catastrophes and a couple of cliffhangers and you have all the makings of a taut mystery with intriguingly murky depths. Sunday nights are stressful again – I wouldn’t have it any other way." In a five-starred review, Empire magazine described Vigil as "[a] relentless conspiracy drama bursting with performers who know how to keep their cards close to their chests. British TV doesn’t get more thrilling than this." Hugo Rifkind in The Times described "[s]etting a whodunnit on a submarine" as "a masterstroke". Giving the programme four stars, Suzy Feay of the Financial Times said that "The submarine setting has the welcome effect of pressure-cooking some fairly standard ingredients into a tasty concoction".

Other reviewers were less complimentary, citing the unrealistic sets and other technical inaccuracies, the implausibility of numerous elements of the plot, and the political bias of the production. James Delingpole in The Spectator described it as "amateurish and implausible", noting that among other issues, "the uniforms are wrong; the ceilings are too high and the sub generally far too spacious" and criticised "the hackneyed dialogue, the implausible plotting and the box-ticking".  Anita Singh in The Telegraph described the series as "so bad it could be Russian propaganda", and her colleague Ed Power noted that "the story was nonsense" and that "the premise was wasted". The Telegraph also reported that the naval advisor working on the series was an SNP councillor and anti-nuclear campaigner, leading to accusations of bias. Carol Midgley in The Times said that "this subpar ocean drama made my heart sink", and described it as "stultifying".

Swedish newspaper Aftonbladet said the series was "effective" in the beginning but more and more became like an "unnecessary under-water version of Line of Duty".

Accolades

|-
! scope="row" | 2022
| GLAAD Media Awards
| Outstanding Limited or Anthology Series
| Vigil| 
| 
|-
! scope="row" | 2022
| British Academy Television Awards
| Drama Series
| Vigil| 
| 
|-
! scope="row" | 2022
| International Emmy Awards
| Best Drama Series
| Vigil''
| 
|
|-

See also 
 Vanguard-class submarine
 Women on submarines

References

External links 

 

2021 British television series debuts
2020s British crime drama television series
2020s British LGBT-related drama television series
2020s British police procedural television series
2020s British mystery television series
BBC crime drama television shows
British thriller television series
English-language television shows
Television shows about murder
Submarines in fiction
Television shows filmed in Scotland
Television shows set in Glasgow
Television shows set in Scotland
Television series by World Productions
Television series by ITV Studios
Television series about nuclear war and weapons